Linyovo is an urban locality (an urban-type settlement) in Zhirnovsky District of Volgograd Oblast, Russia. Population:

References

Urban-type settlements in Volgograd Oblast
Kamyshinsky Uyezd
Volga German people
German communities in Russia